Robert Bolling (August 17, 1738 – July 21, 1775) was an American planter, poet and politician. The great-grandson of Robert Bolling, he was born in Virginia and sent to England for his education. On his return to Virginia, he studied law before taking over at Chellowe, a tobacco plantation operated with slave labor in Buckingham County which Bolling inherited from his father.

Though he published at least 35 poems in British periodicals during his lifetime, more poetry than any other American colonist at the time, most of his works remained in manuscript, and remain unpublished to this day. His papers are now owned by the University of Virginia and the Huntington Library. Bolling also wrote a book entitled A Memoir of a Portion of the Bolling Family in England and Virginia, which published posthumously in 1868; it was originally written in French and translated by a descendant of his brother.

Bolling was a member of the House of Burgesses. He died in July 1775, possibly of a heart attack, in Richmond, Virginia while attending the Third Virginia Convention. The cantata Virginiana was published by composer Gregory Spears in 2015, based on texts written by Bolling during his failed courtship of his cousin, Anne Miller, in 1760.

References

Further reading

External links
Bolling, Robert (1738-1775) at Encyclopedia.com

1738 births
1775 deaths
18th-century American male writers
18th-century American poets
18th-century American politicians
American male poets
American people of English descent
American planters
American slave owners
Bolling family of Virginia
House of Burgesses members
People from Buckingham County, Virginia
Poets from Virginia